Etobicoke Centre can refer to:

Etobicoke Centre (electoral district)
Etobicoke Centre (provincial electoral district)
Islington-City Centre West
Etobicoke, former city, now part of Toronto